
Gmina Siedlisko is a rural gmina (administrative district) in Nowa Sól County, Lubusz Voivodeship, in western Poland.

Villages
Gmina Siedlisko contains the villages and settlements of Bielawy, Borowiec, Dębianka, Kierzno, Piękne Kąty, Radocin, Różanówka, Siedlisko, Ustronie and Zwierzyniec.

Neighbouring gminas
Gmina Siedlisko is bordered by the gminas of Bytom Odrzański, Kotla, Nowa Sól, Sława and Żukowice.

References

Siedlisko
Nowa Sól County